Carl Adolph Castenschiold (1740 – 30 July 1820) was a Danish landowner and royal official. He owned the Knabstrup Manor and Hagestedgaard estates, and was the brother of Joachim Castenschiold.

Early life
Castenschiold was born on St. Thomas in the Danish West Indies, the son of plantation owner Johan Lorentz Carstens and Jacobe von Holten. The family moved to Copenhagen around the time of his birth. They lived in Store Kurkestræde. His father purchased Knabstrup and was ennobled under the name Castenschiold in 1745.

Property and titles
He inherited Knabstrup Manor in 1760 but sold the estate in 1764. He purchased Hagestedgaard in 1769. He was appointed to etatsråd in 1777 and chamberlain in 1780.

Personal life
He married  Dorothea Augusta Brøer (1744 - 14 June 1819) on 5 May 1760 at Hagestedgård. The couple had 10 children but several of them died as infants. He married, for a second time, Dorothea Lyngbye (1761 - 9 July 1838) on 14 June 1820.

References

External links
 Carl Adolph Castenschiold

1740 births
1820 deaths
18th-century Danish landowners
19th-century Danish landowners
Castenschiold family
People from the Danish West Indies